Laura Jeanne Kelly (born January 24, 1950) is an American politician serving since 2019 as the 48th governor of Kansas. A member of the Democratic Party, she represented the 18th district in the Kansas Senate from 2005 to 2019. Kelly was elected governor in 2018, defeating Republican nominee Kris Kobach. She was reelected in 2022, narrowly defeating Republican nominee Derek Schmidt.

Early life and education
Kelly was born in New York City to a military family that moved often and was stationed overseas. She studied at Bradley University in Illinois, earning a Bachelor of Science in psychology (1971), and at Indiana University, earning a Master of Science in therapeutic recreation. (Kelly received the Bradley University Distinguished Alumna award and was inducted into Bradley's Centurion Society on October 4, 2021.)

Kelly worked as a recreation therapist at New York's Rockland Children’s Psychiatric Center. She became director of physical education and recreation therapy at the National Jewish Hospital for Respiratory and Immune Diseases. She then moved to Kansas, and became executive director at the Kansas Recreation and Park Association from 1988 to 2004.

Early political career
Kelly was elected to the Kansas Senate representing northern Topeka in November 2004, later serving as Minority Whip. During her Senate tenure, from 2005 until her 2019 inauguration as governor, she was at times the Ranking Minority member of the Ways and Means Committee, Joint Committee on Home and Community Based Services and KanCare Oversight, and Public Health and Welfare Committee.

In late 2009, Kelly briefly considered a run for Kansas's 2nd congressional district. During the 2011–12 legislative sessions, she served as the Assistant Minority Leader of the Kansas Senate.

Governor of Kansas

Election

2018 

On December 15, 2017, Kelly announced her intention to run for governor of Kansas. In the Democratic primary she ran against former Wichita Mayor Carl Brewer and former Kansas Secretary of Agriculture Josh Svaty. On May 24, 2018, Kelly announced State Senator Lynn Rogers as her running mate. On August 7, she defeated Brewer and Svaty, receiving 51.5% of the vote.

In the general election, Kelly faced Republican Secretary of State Kris Kobach. Kelly was endorsed by former Kansas Governor and U.S. Secretary of Health and Human Services Kathleen Sebelius. She was also endorsed by 28 current or former Republican government officials, including former Kansas Governor Bill Graves; former State Senator, Lt. Governor and U.S. Senator Sheila Frahm, Lt. Gov. Gary Sherrer, Insurance Commissioner Sandy Praeger, Senate President Dick Bond, Senate President David Kerr, Senate Vice President John Vratil, Senate Majority Leaders Tim Emert and Lana Oleen; Senators Barbara Allen, David Wysong, Wint Winter Jr., Pete Brungardt, Ruth Teichman, Barbara Bollier, Audrey Langworthy, Terrie Huntington, Bob Vancrum, and Alicia Salisbury; Representatives JoAnn Pottorff, Ginger Barr, Jim Yonally, Jim Lowther, Fred Lorentz, and Representative and Republican Party Chairperson Rochelle Chronister; Republican National Delegate Don Johnston; and Representatives Joy Koesten and Charles Roth.

Graves said, "Laura Kelly is the only Democrat I have ever endorsed for public office. And the reason I'm doing that now is because I believe so much is at stake in the state of Kansas. I have known Laura for over 30 years. She has all the qualities and all the capabilities that we are looking for to lead the state during this difficult time and to reestablish the state to what it once was. ... Laura has integrity, and I know she will bring Kansans together regardless of party to solve problems." Former Republican state senator Tim Owens was the campaign treasurer for Kansas independent candidate Greg Orman, but he stepped down from that post on October 30 and endorsed Kelly, believing only she could beat Kobach.

Kelly described her candidacy as aimed at reversing the fiscal, educational and other "disasters" of Sam Brownback's governance. She characterized her opponent, who had been noted for his broad disenfranchisement of voters and legal strategies against immigrants, as "Sam Brownback on steroids".

On November 6, Kelly defeated Kobach with 47.8% of the vote.

2022 

Kelly was reelected on November 8, 2022, defeating Kansas Attorney General Derek Schmidt, 49.2% to 47.7%.

Cabinet

Tenure and political positions
Kelly was regarded as a moderate Democrat while she was a state senator, and more liberal as governor.

Budget and economic issues
Kelly was critical of the Kansas experiment, the experimental Kansas budget of her predecessor Sam Brownback that led to cuts in schools, roads, and public safety. She would like to reverse those changes and pointed out that after there were major budget shortages she led a bipartisan effort to successfully balance the budget without increasing taxes.

In 2019, Kelly vetoed two Republican bills that would have cut state income taxes in Kansas. She said that the state could not afford the cuts, and that the Republican bill, which would have cut revenues by an estimated $245 million over a three-year period, would have precipitated a "senseless fiscal crisis" and created a budget deficit. Kelly's decision, as well as higher-than-expected state revenue intakes, led to the state beginning its 2020 budget year with $1.1 billion in cash reserves. She sought to use some of the reserves to pay down debt and make payments to the state pension system. In May 2022, she signed a bill into law that will gradually reduce the sales tax rate on food before eliminating it in 2025.

COVID-19 responses

In response to the COVID-19 pandemic in the United States, Kelly, like other governors, took steps to halt the spread of the SARS-CoV-2 virus, which causes coronavirus disease 2019 (COVID-19). She declared a state of emergency on March 12 following the state's first COVID-19 death, and issued a 60-day ban on public gatherings of 50 or more people and a moratorium on utility shutoffs on March 16. On March 18, citing the unprecedented crisis, Kelly directed the end to all in-person K–12 classes for the remainder of the school year, making Kansas the first state to take that step. On March 23, to combat the virus's spread, she limited public gatherings to ten people. On March 28, amid increasing deaths and illnesses, Kelly issued a "stay at home" order that directed all residents to remain at home, except for travel for essential work, essential business (such as traveling to obtain medical care or groceries), and outdoor exercise with social distancing measures. Almost two dozen states had already issued similar orders, and almost 75% of Kansas's population were already affected by similar orders from local orders, since 25 Kansas counties, including the most populous ones, already had a stay-at-home order in place. Kelly strongly criticized the Trump administration's slow response to the crisis and the federal failure to provide Kansas and other states with adequate supplies of personal protective equipment (such as masks, gloves, and gowns) and testing kits.

The Kansas City Star criticized Kelly's rollout of the COVID-19 vaccine in an editorial lamenting that "Kansas seems to be uniquely underperforming, a recurring issue for Kelly and the administration she leads", citing CDC data showing Kansas near the bottom of vaccinations per 100,000 residents. Members of the Kansas congressional delegation, including fellow Democrat Sharice Davids, have called on Kelly to do more to address backlog of claimants at the Department of Labor seeking unemployment payments from federal programs aimed to help residents out of work due to the pandemic.

On November 16, 2020, Kelly renewed her call for the legislature to join her in the issuance of masking orders.

Executive order on religious gatherings
Because Kelly's orders on public gatherings applied to Easter Sunday celebrations in churches, the Republican-majority Legislative Coordinating Council (LCC), a group of leaders of the Kansas Legislature, voted to revoke her order on a 5–2 party-line vote on April 9, 2020, asserting that the order violated the free exercise of religion. Republican Attorney General Derek Schmidt opposed Kelly's order, issuing a memorandum calling it a violation of the Kansas state law, and urged law enforcement not to enforce it. Kelly called this "shockingly irresponsible"; at the time, there had been more than a thousand confirmed COVID-19 cases, and dozens of confirmed COVID-19 deaths, in Kansas, and of 11 identified sources of contagion, three had come from recent religious gatherings. She challenged the LCC's decision in the Kansas Supreme Court. Following an expedited oral argument (conducted remotely via Zoom teleconference), the state Supreme Court unanimously reinstated Kelly's orders, concluding that her executive order was valid and that the LCC lacked the authority to overturn it.

A week later, in a separate case, U.S. District Judge John W. Broomes in Wichita issued a temporary restraining order blocking enforcement of Kelly's order as to two churches (one in Junction City, the other in Dodge City). contending that the restriction violated religious freedom and free speech rights. That case became moot after Kelly issued a new executive order with less restrictive COVID-19 rules effective on May 4, 2020, under an agreement that allowed the churches to hold larger in-person services but required social distancing.

Healthcare
As governor, Kelly pushed the Republican-controlled Kansas legislature to accept the Medicaid expansion under the Affordable Care Act, to provide health care coverage to up to 150,000 Kansans. A Medicaid expansion plan had passed the Kansas Legislature in 2017, but Brownback vetoed it. In January 2020, after years of Republican opposition, Kelly struck a bipartisan compromise deal with Republican Senate Majority Leader Jim Denning that made Kansas the 38th state to accept the Medicaid expansion. Under the agreement, on January 1, 2021, Medicaid coverage was expanded to Kansas residents earning up to 138% of the federal poverty level. In 2021, Kelly called for further expansion of Medicaid, proposing to pay for it with the revenue from the legalization of medical marijuana.

Kelly has also supported reforming KanCare so that more citizens have access to health insurance.

Human services
Kelly combined the Department of Children and Family Services with the Department of Aging and Disability Services into a consolidated, integrated Department of Human Services.

In January 2020, Kelly called for major changes to the Osawatomie State Hospital, the long-troubled state psychiatric hospital that has faced scrutiny from federal regulators over security, safety, and treatment lapses. She has supported a plan for state funding for mental health crisis centers in the state.

School funding
Kelly has stated that she would like to ensure Kansas schools are funded and focus on improving the performance of Kansas students to be competitive with other parts of the country. For example, she would address the statewide teacher shortage and improve pay for educators. She would also like to expand early childhood programs and increase options for students pursuing higher education.

Social issues
In her first official act as governor, Kelly signed an executive order reinstating the employment discrimination protections for LGBT state workers that Governor Sam Brownback had eliminated in 2015.

Kelly opposed a Republican-proposed anti-abortion amendment to the Kansas Constitution in early 2020, saying it would return Kansas to the "dark ages". Amid acrimonious debate, the state House fell four votes short of the two-thirds majority required to put it on the state ballot. In 2022, she expressed her opposition to the 2022 Kansas abortion referendum that would have removed the right to an abortion from the state constitution. The amendment was defeated, with nearly 60% of voters rejecting it.

Personal life 
Kelly has been married to physician Ted Daughety, a specialist in pulmonary and sleep disorders, since 1979. They moved to Topeka in 1986. They have two adult daughters, Kathleen and Molly Daughety.

Kelly is Catholic.

Electoral history

See also 
 List of female governors in the United States

Notes

References

Further reading
Publications concerning Governor Kelly's administration available via the State Library of Kansas

External links

 official government website
Laura Kelly for Governor campaign website

|-

|-

|-

|-

|-

1950 births
21st-century American politicians
21st-century American women politicians
Bradley University alumni
Catholics from Kansas
Catholics from New York (state)
Democratic Party governors of Kansas
Indiana University Bloomington alumni
Democratic Party Kansas state senators
Living people
Politicians from New York City
Women state governors of the United States
Women state legislators in Kansas
Women state constitutional officers of Kansas